Kizomba is a dance and musical genre that originated in Angola in 1984.

Kizomba means "party" in Kimbundu, a Bantu language spoken by the Ambundu in Angola.

Origin and evolution

Music genre
The origins of kizomba can be traced to late-1970s Africa, with influences variably attributed to Angola. Kizomba is characterized by a slower, romantic, more sensuous rhythm than the traditional Angolan semba music. Kizomba music emerged as a fusion of Semba, Angolan Merengue, Kilapanga, and further Angolan music influences: It slowed down the cadence of songs and added a stronger bass line to the composition of instruments. Eduardo Paim is internationally recognized as the "father/creator of Kizomba music", as he and his band were taking a major role in the development of the music style creation. Most kizomba songs are sung in Portuguese or a dialect from the various Portuguese-speaking, African cultures.

Dance genre

Semba has been danced in the 1950s in Angola. In the 1990s, when the actual kizomba music got more and more popular, Angolan semba dancers started to adapt their semba steps according to the tempo and flavor of the Kizomba beats. The Kizomba dance is a couple dance, in which the torso and right arm of the leader will guide the follower across the dance floor. It is the goal to synchronize perfectly as a couple with the music and express it through elegant footwork, smooth body movement, and attitude, called Ginga (for women) and Banga (for men).

Confusion with cola-zouk
Cape Verdean immigrants who moved to France in the 1980s were exposed to Zouk music. They blended it with a traditional Cape Verde style called the coladeira, thus creating cola-zouk, similar to kizomba and typically sung in Cape Verdean Creole. It is this rhythm that was confused with kizomba and was heard in Portugal when Eduardo Paim arrived there and released his first record with kizomba music.

Cultural influences
The influence of kizomba is felt in most Portuguese-speaking African countries, but also in Portugal (especially in Lisbon and surrounding suburbs such as Amadora or Almada), where communities of immigrants have established clubs centered on the genre in a renewed kizomba style. The São Tomean kizomba music is very similar to the Angolan, Juka being the most notable among the Sãotomeans, and also one of the most notable performers in the genre.

In Angola, most clubs are based in Luanda. Famous Angolan kizomba musicians include Neide Van-Dúnem, Don Kikas, C4 Pedro, Calo Pascoal, Irmãos Verdades, Anselmo Ralph, among many others, but Bonga is probably the best known Angolan artist, having helped popularize the style both in Angola and Portugal during the 1970s and 1980s.

Popularity
Kizomba is known for having a slow, insistent, somewhat harsh yet sensuous rhythm as the result of electronic percussion. It is danced accompanied by a partner, very smoothly, slowly and sensuously, and with neither tightness nor rigidity. There are frequent simultaneous hip rotations coordinated between dance partners, particularly in the quieter refrains of the music. Several individuals with a love of the Kizomba culture have been promoting it in other countries.

Famous Angolan kizomba singers include Bonga, André Mingas, Liceu Vieira Dias, Neide Van-Dúnem, Don Kikas, Calo Pascoal, Heavy C., Puto Portugues, Maya Cool, Matias Damasio, Rei Helder, Pérola, Anselmo Ralph and Irmãos Verdades.

Famous Angolan teachers such as kota José N'dongala (founder of the Kizombalove Academy) and Mestre Petchu (founder of the Tradicional Kilandukilu Ballet) have been giving Kizomba and Semba teachers courses for years to further popularize their Angolan cultural values in Africa, Europe and in America.

Cape Verde 
Cape Verdean singers and producers with kizomba compilations include Suzanna Lubrano, Atim, Nilton Ramalho, Johnny Ramos, Nelson Freitas, Mika Mendes, Manu Lima, Cedric Cavaco, Elji Beatzkilla, Loony Johnson, Klazzik, Mark G, To Semedo, Beto Dias, Heavy H, Marcia, Gilyto, Kido Semedo, Ricky Boy, Klaudio Ramos, M&N Pro, Gilson, Gil, G-Amado, Philip Monteiro, Gama, Juceila Cardoso and Denis Graça, Z-BeatZ Pro AudioHustlin'. Original influential music styles from Cape Verde are funaná, morna, coladeira and batuque. Thanks to the French Antilles konpa promoted as Zouk love and the strong influence of semba (from Angola), Cape Verdean singers have developed significantly kizomba and zouk (mixing it with coladeira) known as Cabo love or cola-dance. Moreover, every lusophone country has developed its own Kizomba music flavor.

Brazil
In Brazil, kizomba became famous when the pop artist Kelly Key released the album No Controle, on February 3, 2015. Key left the dance-pop/R&B songs to introduce the kizomba in Brazil. In an interview Key said she sought originality and new styles: "I'm running this responsibility of being predictable. I wanted to record Kizomba for 13 years! Now I feel mature and have knowledge of movement".

China
Kizomba is growing in popularity in some major Chinese cities such as Beijing, Shanghai and Shenzhen. Some teachers of kizomba are Chinese while others are foreign. Every year, different Latin dance festivals are organized and presented such as Shanghai Bachata/Kizomba Festival.

References

External links

 
African dances
Partner dance
Angolan music
Articles containing video clips